Jack Berry (1944–2003) was an Irish sportsperson.  He played hurling with his local club St Anne's and was a member of the Wexford senior inter-county team from 1968 until 1973.

References

1944 births
2003 deaths
St Anne's (Wexford) hurlers
Wexford inter-county hurlers
Leinster inter-provincial hurlers
All-Ireland Senior Hurling Championship winners